The 1920 German football championship, the 13th edition of the competition, was won by 1. FC Nürnberg, defeating SpVgg Fürth 2–0 in the final. It was the first edition of the championship after the First World War and was staged six years after the previous championship in 1914.

For 1. FC Nürnberg it was the first national championship and was the start of Nuremberg's most successful era where the club won five titles in eight seasons from 1920 to 1927, missing out on a sixth one in the inconclusive 1922 championship. Fürth, the defending champions, would go on to win the 1926 and 1929 championship. It was the only encounter of the two Middle Franconian rivals in the final.

Nuremberg's Heinrich Träg and Fürth's Lony Seiderer and Viktor Hierländer were the top scorer of the 1920 championship with four goals each.

Eight clubs qualified for the knock-out competition, the champions of each of the seven regional football championships and the defending German champions.

Qualified teams
The teams qualified through the regional championships:

Competition

Quarter-finals
The quarter-finals, played on 16 May 1920:

|}

Semi-finals
The semi-finals, played on 30 May 1920:

|}

Final

References

Sources
 kicker Allmanach 1990, by kicker, page 160 to 178 – German championship
 Süddeutschlands Fussballgeschichte in Tabellenform 1897-1988  History of Southern German football in tables, publisher & author: Ludolf Hyll

External links
 German Championship 1919–20 at weltfussball.de 
 German Championship 1920 at RSSSF

1
German
German football championship seasons